Looking for Moshe Guez (Le'an Ne'elam Moshe Guez) is a 2011 Israeli documentary film directed by Avida Livny, documenting his search for the Israeli director Moshe Guez, and his "lost" feature film, The Angel was a Devil.

Synopsis
Looking for Moshe Guez follows director Avida Livny as he searches for a childhood memory: his memories from the first Israeli horror film, The Angel Was a Devil, which he has seen once in the 1980s, as a 10-year-old. Having forgotten about the film, he "discovers" it again in a book by Meir Schnitzer concerning Israeli cinema, where it is described as "the worst film ever made in Israel".

The first part of Looking for Moshe Guez focuses on the search in Israel, which was produced between 1971 and 1976, with Guez as the film director, screenwriter, star, cinematographer, recorder and editor. Among the participants who remember Guez or his film are journalist Lisa Peretz, played by Ophelia Strahl, who described it as the "Israeli Ed Wood". The second part of the film, which takes part in the Boston area where Guez and his family have been living since the 1980s, enables us to see for the first time scenes from the "director's cut".

Cast
 Ophelia Strahl
 Moshe Guez
 Shulamit Guez
 Ofer Guez
 Yair Partok
 Eli Sandler
 Miri Ben David
 Karin Dadon
 Liraz Gadri
 Lisa Peretz
 Shuki Gazit
 Geula Gazit
 Zehava Damari
 Shalom Damari
 Dror Yizhar

Production
The film was produced by Gidi Avivi for Noga Communications – Channel 8 with the support of the Yehoshua Rabinovich Foundation for the Arts – Cinema Project.

Reception

Critical response
Avner Shavit, the film critic of Walla, describes the unique manner in which Livny presents Guez's story, without being judgmental or condescending. Shavit sees the film as "a moving, fascinating and unforgettable work of art about the different dimensions of the endless passion for film, about the eccentric dimension of local culture, and about the fact that time sometimes does not heal wounds, only makes them more painful."

Festivals, awards and nominations
The premiere screening of Looking for Moshe Guez took place at the Haifa International Film Festival, on October 19, 2011. The film was selected to the 2011 edition of IDFA's Docs for Sale.

See also
 Ed Wood (film)

External links
 
 
 
 Looking for Moshe Guez on IDFA's Docs for Sale

2011 films
Documentary films about film directors and producers
2010s Hebrew-language films
2011 documentary films
Israeli documentary films